Double Bummer is a double-LP by Bongwater which was released in 1988. The four-sided album contained songs about people ranging from Frank Sinatra, David Bowie, Ronald Reagan, and a Cantonese version of Led Zeppelin's "Dazed and Confused". In 1998, the album was remastered by Alan Douches and Kramer for its inclusion in Box of Bongwater set.  Music videos for the songs "Lesbians of Russia" and "Jimmy" were directed by Jim Spring and Jens Jurgensen. The album is referenced in the lyrics to the song "Lariat" by Stephen Malkmus and the Jicks.

Track listing

Personnel 
Adapted from the Double Bummer liner notes.

Bongwater
Kramer – vocals, instruments, production, engineering
David Licht – drums
Ann Magnuson – vocals, instruments
Dave Rick – guitar

Production and additional personnel
Don Cherry – trumpet
Michael Macioce – photography
Gary Windo – tenor saxophone

Release history

References

External links 
 

1988 debut albums
Albums produced by Kramer (musician)
Bongwater (band) albums
Shimmy Disc albums